Felix Schreiner (born 29 January 1986) is a German politician of the Christian Democratic Union (CDU) who has been serving as a member of the Bundestag from the state of Baden-Württemberg since 2017.

Political career 
Schreiner first became a member of the Bundestag in the 2017 German federal election. In parliament, he has since been a member of the Committee on Transport and Digital Infrastructure. In 2022, he also joined the Parliamentary Advisory Board on Sustainable Development.

Other activities 
 Federal Network Agency for Electricity, Gas, Telecommunications, Posts and Railway (BNetzA), Alternate Member of the Rail Infrastructure Advisory Council (since 2022)

References

External links 

  
 Bundestag biography 

1986 births
Living people
Members of the Bundestag for Baden-Württemberg
Members of the Bundestag 2017–2021
Members of the Bundestag 2021–2025
Members of the Bundestag for the Christian Democratic Union of Germany
Members of the Landtag of Baden-Württemberg